The following is a list of events affecting Philippine television in 2022. Events listed include: television show debuts, finales and cancellations; channel and streaming launches, closures and rebrandings; as well as information about controversies and carriage disputes.

Events

January
 January 1
 Colours and One Screen have ceased its operations by Cignal TV due to the review of the management's decision through changes in business direction.
 BEAM TV migrated its broadcast signal reception to digital terrestrial transmission from switching off its analog frequency in nationwide areas after 10 years.
 In colliding with the 35th anniversary, ABS-CBN's flagship newscast TV Patrol silently resumed its free-to-air broadcast through A2Z after almost two years of limited accessibility on pay television airing and digital online streaming resulted to the lapsed of its broadcast franchise in 2020. Alongside with its terrestrial return, the newscast updated its new logo, on-air graphics and opening billboard on January 3, as well as some changes on its anchors and segments which introduced in October 2021, while retaining its theme music arrangement song that was used since 2010 and the opening line.
 Professional volleyball player Alyssa Valdez and singer Anji Salvacion were named as the Top 2 Finalist on the Celebrity Edition of Pinoy Big Brother: Kumunity Season 10.
 GMA Artist Center rebranded to Sparkle or simply "Sparkle GMA Artist Center", which added the Sparkle word to its former name.
 January 5
 Advanced Media Broadcasting System, a broadcast media firm of Prime Asset Ventures, Inc. through Streamtech's Planet Cable owned by a billionaire business magnate and former politician Manny Villar, took over about two broadcasting channels and frequencies previously assigned by ABS-CBN Corporation including VHF Channel 2 (where it given an 18-month temporary permit effective January 6 to operate in test broadcast for the usage of analog TV frequency through Metro Manila until the scheduled shut off in 2023) and UHF Channel 16 (where it issued an 18-month provisional authority to operate in use for digital TV frequency through Mega Manila) as announced in a press statement order release on January 25 that had been reviewed by the Department of Justice, the Department of Information and Communications Technology and the Office of the Executive Secretary for no objection on the assignment of vacated and available frequencies in its legal qualifications, after the National Telecommunications Commission recalled all radio frequencies and channels of ABS-CBN following the lapsed of its congressional franchise in 2020.
 Aliw Broadcasting Corporation (a broadcast organization of ALC Group of Companies that operates a number of Home Radio & DWIZ branded radio stations) took over UHF Channel 23 and Swara Sug Media Corporation (a broadcast arm of the Kingdom of Jesus Christ that operates Sonshine Media Network International led by their church leader and televangelist Pastor Apollo C. Quiboloy) took over UHF Channel 43, all previously assigned by AMCARA Broadcasting Network (a former affiliate of ABS-CBN Corporation that was used for blocktime purposes in 1996) where it ordered a provisional authority to operate in use for digital TV frequency through Manila as announced in a press statement order release on January 26 that had been reviewed by the Department of Justice, the Department of Information and Communications Technology and the Office of the Executive Secretary for no objection on the assignment of vacated and available frequencies in its legal qualifications, after the National Telecommunications Commission recalled all radio frequencies and channels of ABS-CBN following the lapsed of its congressional franchise in 2020.
 January 6 - Sky Cable terminated beIN Sports 2 on its line-up due to the revamping of the network's programming and is set for transferring to a different channel assignment. Meanwhile, the network continued to air via Cignal and G Sat. In addition, beIN Media Group revived beIN Sports 3 as its 2nd incarnation of the said channel after two years and five months of inactivity transmission.
 January 9 - Intercontinental Broadcasting Corporation temporary stopped its broadcast due to the disinfection of their premises in Quezon City.
 January 10
 Premier Tennis rebranded to Premier Sports 2, as a counterpart channel to Premier Sports.
 CNN Philippines temporary stopped its broadcast and limited its programming through online due to the limitations caused by the implementation of health protocols in their broadcast center in Mandaluyong.
 Sky Cable returned beIN Sports 2 on their line-up with a new channel assignment after 4 days of halt broadcast on its provider.
 January 15 - ABS-CBN Entertainment and Viu sealed a content partnership to bring top-quality contents to Filipino viewers on the said streaming platform by kicking off on January 22.
 January 19 - SatLite terminated six channels: Al Jazeera, Central Luzon Television, eGG Network, Lifetime, Pinoy Xtreme and Telenovela Channel, on its line-up due to the review of the provider's decision. The following day, SatLite launched eight channels on their line-up: Asian Food Network, Cinemax, DreamWorks Channel (both in separate Tagalog-dubbed and main English-dubbed feeds), HBO Hits, Lotus Macau, Moonbug Kids, Rock Extreme and TAP Edge.
 January 26 - Sky Cable celebrated its 30th anniversary of service provider formation.
 January 29 - IBilib celebrated its tenth anniversary on Philippine television.

February
 February 4 - The Kapisanan ng mga Brodkaster ng Pilipinas organized their presidential forum, "Panata sa Bayan: The KBP Presidential Candidates Forum" which syndicating aired in over 300 stations nationwide through multiple organization-chapter members on all radio networks and TV channels, as well as other providers, platforms and online streaming worldwide (including via A2Z, ABS-CBN, Bombo Radyo Philippines, CNN Philippines, Far East Broadcasting Company, Manila Broadcasting Company, Radio Mindanao Network, Radyo Pilipino and TV5/Cignal).
 February 4–20 - The 2022 Winter Olympics was held in Beijing, China. MediaQuest Holdings (Cignal TV) awarded the local rights to the annual games as part of a deal with the Philippine Olympic Committee which aired on One Sports, One Sports+ and Cignal Play. It also marked both the sixth overall consecutive games of Cignal and the third consecutive winter games of MediaQuest (which introduced for the 2014 Winter Olympic Games).
 February 7 - ABS-CBN Entertainment and YouTube extended its partnership to co-produced locally exclusive originals on the said online platform.
 February 15 - Sonshine Media Network International and The Manila Times organized their first presidential debates, "SMNI Presidential Debate 2022" that held at the Okada Manila in Parañaque.
 February 19 - Rock Entertainment Holdings launched Global Trekker in the Philippines.
 February 26–27 - CNN Philippines and BusinessMirror organized their vice presidential (on February 26) and presidential (on February 27) debates, "The Filipino Votes: Presidential and Vice Presidential Debates 2022" that held at the Quadricentennial Pavilion of the University of Santo Tomas in Manila.

March
 March 2 - TV Patrol celebrated its 35th anniversary on Philippine television.
 March 2–3 - Sonshine Media Network International and The Manila Times organized their two-day senatorial debates, "SMNI Senatorial Debate" that took place at the Okada Manila in Parañaque.
 March 5 - Singer-actor Patrick Quiroz was proclaimed the Ultimate Bida-Oke Sing-lebrity grand winner of the first season of Sing Galing: Sing-lebrity Edition.
 March 10 - SPOTV Now, a streaming service owned by Eclat Media Group, was launched and became available in the Philippines, alongside Hong Kong, Malaysia and Singapore.
 March 12
 Isabel Laohoo of Leyte and Nathan Juane of Las Piñas were named as the Top 2 Finalist on the Adult Edition of Pinoy Big Brother: Kumunity Season 10.
 Mari Mar Tua of Pampanga was hailed as the Ultimate Bida-Oke Star grand winner of the first season of Sing Galing!.
 March 19–20 - The Commission on Elections and Vote Pilipinas (a group made by Impact Hub Manila) organized their PiliPinas Debates 2022: The Turning Point with presidential (for first on March 19) and vice presidential (for first and only on March 20) debates were held at Sofitel Philippine Plaza Manila in Pasay, which simultaneously broadcast on different platforms and providers through TV channels and networks, radio stations, and digital online livestreaming (airing via ABS-CBN News Channel, CNN Philippines, DepEd TV on GMA's digital channel, One News, One PH, People's Television Network, TeleRadyo, TV5 for presidential debates only and UNTV as well as delayed telecast via A2Z and Light TV).
 March 26 - Sonshine Media Network International and The Manila Times organized their second and last presidential debates, "The Deep Probe: The SMNI Presidential Candidates Interview" that took place at the Okada Manila in Parañaque.
 March 28 - G Sat terminated Myx and Telenovela Channel on its line-up due to the revamping of the provider's channel space assignments. Myx continued to air via Cignal, SatLite and Sky Cable, while Telenovela Channel continued to air via Cignal and Sky Cable. In addition, G Sat launched TAP Action Flix and TAP Movies on their line-up.
 March 29 - Nation Broadcasting Corporation, a subsidiary of MediaQuest Holdings under PLDT Beneficial Trust Fund that carries One Sports and Radyo5, granted an amendment of its congressional franchise under Republic Act No. 11667 (which previously Republic Act No. 8623), allowing NBC to operate radio and television stations nationwide.

April
 April 1
 After eleven months and twenty-six days of broadcasting in the Philippines, WakuWaku Japan has ceased its operations by SKY Perfect JSAT across Asia due to the review of the management's decision through changes in business direction.
 Sky Cable terminated HITS on its line-up due to being unable to agree on both sides for the renewal terms on its channel carriage. Meanwhile, the network continued to air via Cignal, G Sat, SatLite and Cablelink.
 Rock Entertainment Holdings launched Love Nature airing in native 4K resolution, making the first channel broadcast in the Philippines.
 April 3 - The Commission on Elections and Vote Pilipinas (a group made by Impact Hub Manila) organized their PiliPinas Debates 2022: The Turning Point with second and last presidential debates were held at Sofitel Philippine Plaza Manila in Pasay, which simultaneously broadcast on different platforms and providers through TV channels and networks, radio stations, and digital online livestreaming (airing via ABS-CBN News Channel, CNN Philippines, DepEd TV on GMA's digital channel, Intercontinental Broadcasting Corporation, One News, One PH, People's Television Network, TeleRadyo and UNTV).
 April 5 - ABS-CBN Corporation and GMA Network, Inc. sealed a content partnership to license some of the most popular and well-loved movies from Star Cinema airing on GMA's owned local channels.
 April 6 - Globe Telecom through 917Ventures Retirement Fund launched a multi-platform innovative tradigital (traditional and digital) entertainment company, Kroma Entertainment.
 April 7 - Net 25 resumed its free-to-air broadcast through Channel 25's analog channel after almost three years of its mitigation to digital frequency while being on test broadcast in 2018.
 April 12 - TeleRadyo celebrated its 15th anniversary of broadcasting.
 April 19 - ABS-CBN Entertainment and Netflix extended its content partnership to stream ABS-CBN's produced programs through early simultaneous release ahead with the ABS-CBN platforms on the said streaming service beginning on May 13.

May
 May 3–6 - The Commission on Elections and the Kapisanan ng mga Brodkaster ng Pilipinas organized their single candidate and team-panel interview format forum, "COMELEC–KBP PiliPinas Forum 2022" with live and pre-recorded schedule tapings that held at various locations on May 2–6, which syndicating aired in over 300 stations nationwide through multiple organization-chapter members on all radio networks and TV channels, as well as other providers, platforms and online streaming worldwide (including via ABS-CBN Corporation, Bombo Radyo Philippines, CNN Philippines, Far East Broadcasting Company, Manila Broadcasting Company, Primax Broadcasting Network, Radio Mindanao Network, Radyo Pilipino, TV5 Network, Inc. and Vanguard Radio Network). Originally intended to be PiliPinas Debates 2022: The Turning Point on April 23–24 with vice presidential (for second and last on April 23) and presidential (for third and last on April 24) town hall debates but later postponed to April 30–May 1 with vice presidential (for second and last on April 30) and presidential (for third and last on May 1) in the same format. However, it was cancelled on April 25 due to the financial payment debt issues between Vote Pilipinas (a group made by Impact Hub Manila, the debate's organizer and production) and Philippine Plaza Holdings (owner of Sofitel Philippine Plaza Manila, the debate's official venue), as well as the inevitable scheduling conflicts of the candidates.
 May 4 - UAAP Varsity Channel expanded its broadcast through online streaming via iWantTFC for international viewers only, with One Sports remained as the official broadcasting rights to the league. Thus marked the return of University Athletic Association of the Philippines on ABS-CBN Corporation after two years following the lapsed of its broadcast franchise that led the dissolution of ABS-CBN Sports in 2020.
 May 5 - iWantTFC and Red Bull GmbH signed a partnership to stream curated international premium contents from Red Bull featuring sporting matches and lifestyle events on the streaming service in the Philippines beginning on May 8.
 May 9 - Aliw Broadcasting Corporation launched its own broadcasting network, IZTV.
 May 9–10 - All Philippine TV networks had its special coverage of the 2022 elections.
 May 12 - Star Magic celebrated its 30th anniversary of talent agency formation.
 May 12–23 - The 2021 Southeast Asian Games was held in Hanoi, Vietnam after six months of postponement due to the COVID-19 pandemic in Vietnam. MediaQuest Holdings (Cignal TV) and its sister company Smart Communications awarded the local rights to the annual games which aired on One Sports, One Sports+, Cignal Play and Smart Gigafest.
 May 14 - Gabb Skribikin of Pasig and Rob Blackburn of Laguna were named as the Top 2 Finalist on the Teen Edition of Pinoy Big Brother: Kumunity Season 10.
 May 23 - ABS-CBN, Kroma Entertainment and 917Ventures, in partnership with Broadcast Enterprises and Affiliated Media, launched a real-time multi-format, multi-platform and multi-screen tradigital interactive entertainment channel airing via BEAM TV's digital subchannel, cable and satellite, and online through YouTube, official website and GLife on GCash for May 28, Pinoy Interactive Entertainment (PIE) Channel.
 May 29 - Singer Anji Salvacion from the Celebrity Edition was proclaimed as the winner of Pinoy Big Brother: Kumunity Season 10.

June
 June 1
 TeleRadyo resumed its free-to-air broadcast through ZOE TV's digital subchannel after nearly two years of halt broadcast due to the lapsed of its broadcast franchise in 2020. Alongside with its terrestrial return, the channel modified its on-air bug logo on May 16 with an incorporated ABS-CBN mark to reflected its branding identity.
 Knowledge Channel has transferred its digital subchannel assignment to Channel 31, where PIE Channel is among in the said broadcast frequency, from Channel 50 with BEAM TV remained as part of its digital frequency due the former frequency's poor signal reception. Meanwhile, four other BEAM TV's digital subchannels assigned on Channel 50 including BEAM TV (a standalone broadcasting network with DepEd TV as its main sole programming), Life TV, TV Shop Philippines, and a timeshare programming subchannel of Oras ng Himala Channel and Pilipinas HD, were remained with the same frequency until June 30 (excluding a sole programming subchannel of DepEd TV).
 June 4 - A&Q Entertainment, Prime Stream, Inc. and Sun Mobile Commerce launched a joint Filipino-Korean partner-owned hybrid streaming company with AQ Prime Entertainment as one of its offerings, AQ Prime Stream.
 June 10 - Lionsgate Play, a streaming service owned by Lionsgate through its partner PLDT (under the brand PLDT Home), was launched and became available in the Philippines.
 June 11 - Mars Pa More (formerly known as Mars since 2019) celebrated its tenth anniversary on Philippine television.
 June 16 - Cignal launched four channels on their line-up: Deutsche Welle, Kapamilya Channel (in HD feed), SPOTV and SPOTV2, as well as the returned channel, Fox News Channel.
 June 18 - Singer-songwriter Kris Lawrence (portrayed as "Panda") was proclaimed the grand winner of the second season of Masked Singer Pilipinas.
 June 20
 G Sat terminated ETC on its line-up due to the network's rebranding on July 11. Meanwhile, the network continued to air via Channel 21 in Metro Manila, Cignal, SatLite, Sky Cable and Cablelink (until June 22 only) until the said rebrand date. In addition, G Sat launched SMNI on their line-up.
 GMA Network, Inc. launched a livestreaming exclusive episodes for new and current shows of GMA on their digital and online platforms such as Facebook, TikTok and YouTube, Kapuso Stream.
 June 29 - Wish Ko Lang! celebrated its 20th anniversary on Philippine television.
 June 30 - After one year and eight months, DepEd TV has ceased service operations on various channel listings via free-to-air and pay TV providers in preparation for the return of face-to-face classes. Meanwhile, DepEd TV NCR Prime, DepEd TV NCR Smart and DepEd TV ALS  will continue to air on digital free-to-air subchannels and pay TV providers.

July
 July 8 - Jungo TV, through its release partner Dito Telecommunity, launched a Filipino-dedicated streaming service for its owned and acquired content offerings, Jungo Pinoy.
 July 11
 Solar Entertainment Corporation rebranded ETC into two channels: Scream Flix (through its partnership with Jungo TV, which is the Philippine version of a global TV network of the same name and used as a programming block of Hallypop since 2021, a horror-dedicated movie channel featuring its sub-genre films) and Solar Flix (through its subsidiary Southern Broadcasting Network, a Tagalog movie channel showcasing classic Filipino and indie films, shorts, and documentaries from local festivals, as well as general entertainment from ETC's current and existing programming), after nearly 19 years of broadcasting due to programming redundancies, lack of advertising support and cross-cutting measures.
 ABS-CBN Entertainment, Brightlight Productions, TV5 Network, Inc. and ZOE Broadcasting Network extended their collaboration to aired ABS-CBN and Brightlight produced noontime variety programs via A2Z, Kapamilya Channel and TV5 beginning on July 16.
 July 16 - In colliding with its debut on TV5, ABS-CBN's noontime variety program It's Showtime resumed their live studio audience after almost two years on behind closed door productions resulted to the COVID-19 pandemic in 2020. Alongside with its audience return, the program updated its new logo and opening theme, as well as refurbished studio on July 25.
 July 18 - Sky Cable terminated Loveworld Asia on its line-up due to the network's pull-out from the satellite broadcast dish provider's line-up. Meanwhile, the network migrated and continued to air through online.
 July 23 - Sam Coloso of Parañaque was hailed as first Showtime Sexy Babe grand winner on It's Showtime.
 July 26 - iWantTFC launched FashionTV on their live channel streaming line-up.

August
 August 8
 AQ Prime Entertainment launched an over-the-top streaming media service platform, AQ Prime.
 GMA Network, Inc. launched a recapping exclusive episodes for old and well-loved shows of GMA on their YouTube channel, Stream Together.
 August 12 - After nearly seven years of its broadcast programming run, FPJ's Ang Probinsyano aired its series finale with a total of 1,696 episodes, making the longest-running primetime series on Philippine television.
 August 19 - ABS-CBN's Knowledge Channel launched "School Anywhere", a campaign program complementing the Department of Education's requirement of a hybrid learning curriculum on basic education which targeted teachers and students in supplementing both classroom and distance learning.

September
 September 1 - MTV Asia rebranded to MTV 90s across Southeast Asia due to the planned restructuring content of Paramount Networks EMEAA (a unit of Paramount International Networks owned by Paramount Global) as part of the upcoming launch of their own streaming service in the region.
 September 5 - iWantTFC launched four Jungo TV channels on their live channel streaming line-up: A8 ESports, Black Belt TV, Scream Flix and Toro TV.
 September 6 - A minor fire broke out at the ABS-CBN Broadcasting Center in Quezon City, causing the temporary suspension of its operations inside the building, resulted to the halt broadcast interruptions of ABS-CBN News Channel and TeleRadyo, which immediately resumed afterwards.
 September 7 - Nine Media Corporation (CNN Philippines) and Villar Group's Prime Asset Ventures, Inc. (Streamtech through Planet Cable's Advanced Media Broadcasting System) entered a content license partnership to simultaneously aired the former's primetime newscast on AMBS' upcoming broadcast network beginning on September 13.
 September 13 - Advanced Media Broadcasting System initially or softly launched its own broadcasting network, All TV. Alongside with its launch, Villar Group's Prime Asset Ventures, Inc. (Streamtech through Planet Cable's Advanced Media Broadcasting System) and Globe Telecom's Group Retirement Fund (Bethlehem Holdings, Inc. through Broadcast Enterprises and Affiliated Media) signed an agreement to broadcast the said channel through BEAM TV's digital subchannel assignment as part of their nationwide expansion.
 September 18 - Khimo Gumatay of Makati was hailed as the grand winner of the second season of Idol Philippines.

October
 October 1
 After almost eight years of broadcasting in the Philippines, H2 has ceased its operations by A&E Networks across Southeast Asia due to the review of the management's decision through changes in business direction.
 Cablelink terminated Travelxp on its line-up due to the review of the network's subscription performance.
 Tap Go made its official relaunch with the addition of new, FAST channels such as Laff, Crime TV, Comic U, and Game Show Central.
 October 6 - ABS-CBN Corporation and Warner Bros. Discovery (through its Asia-Pacific division) inked a content distribution deal to air Metro Channel's lifestyle programs in Central and Southeast Asia on international cable channels via Asian Food Network and Discovery Asia, as well as Discovery+ for on-demand.
 October 7 - Tadhana celebrated its 5th anniversary on Philippine television.
 October 11 - Cignal TV, in partnership with University of the Philippines, launched a university-dedicated educational channel, TVUP.
 October 12 - Precious Paula Nicole of Camarines Norte was hailed as the grand winner of the first season of Drag Race Philippines.
 October 14 - Sky Cable terminated RT on its line-up due to the network's unavailability on the said provider since March. Meanwhile, the network continued to air via Cablelink and other pay television providers.
 October 22
 Jeepney TV celebrated its tenth anniversary of broadcasting.
 Anne Patricia Lorenzo of Manila was hailed as third Ms. Q and A: Kweens of the Multibeks 2022 grand winner on It's Showtime.
 October 24 - Wil TV Network (owned by celebrity businessman Willie Revillame) launched its own digital community service platform, Flex TV.
 October 26 - After a year and a month, Philippine Collective Media Corporation and ZOE Broadcasting Network announced a termination of its affiliation agreement for broadcasting A2Z on PRTV's owned Channel 12.

November
 November 1 - ZOE Broadcasting Network terminated TeleRadyo on ZOE TV's digital subchannel line-up via Channel 20 due to the expiration of its licensing agreement with the network. Meanwhile, the network continued to air via Sky Cable and other cable providers, as well as through online via ABS-CBN News' social media platforms, official website and mobile application (including iWantTFC). In addition, ZOE Broadcasting Network launched Light TV on the same digital assignment frequency slot in Metro Manila (whereas the aforementioned network is currently broadcast in other regional areas since January), with Channel 33 carrying the same channel remained on-air.
 November 3 - Setanta Sports, a global sports broadcasting brand, was launched both as a linear channel and as an OTT service in the Philippines. This comes after a joint partnership between Setanta founders and owner Adjara Group bought the exclusive broadcasting rights of the Premier League for the said country, after its previous broadcast partner TAP DMV's contract with the said league was expired.
 November 15 - GMA News and Public Affairs rebranded to GMA Integrated News and Public Affairs or simply "GMA Integrated News", which added the Integrated word to its former name, synergized into an integrated news division joint with GMA Regional TV and GMA News Online.
 November 17 - Disney+, a streaming service owned by Disney Streaming under Disney Media and Entertainment Distribution (a division of The Walt Disney Company) through its telecommunications partner Globe Telecom (including a joint-ventured with Alipay for GCash via Alipay+), was launched and became available in the Philippines.
 November 18 - Sky Cable launched IZTV on their line-up, as well as the returned channel, Golden Nation Network (formerly Global News Network at the time of the channel's termination on the said provider).
 November 20–December 19 - The 2022 FIFA World Cup was recently held in Qatar. TAP Digital Media Ventures Corporation thru its World Cup TV pay-per-view service awarded the local rights to the annual games which aired on TAP Sports, Premier Sports, Premier Football and TAP Go TV, as well as separate pay-per-view via Cignal, G Sat, Sky Cable, Cablelink, various provincial providers (Air Cable, Asian Vision, Planet Cable and Parasat), and selected commercial establishments.
 November 28 - Born to Be Wild celebrated its 15th anniversary on Philippine television.

December
 December 2 - Magpakailanman celebrated its 20th anniversary on Philippine television.
 December 3 - Emil Malaborbor was hailed as the first Ultimate Bida-O-Kid Star grand winner of Sing Galing Kids.
 December 10
 Carmela Lorzano of Batangas was hailed as the Ultimate Bida-Oke Star grand winner of the second season of Sing Galing!.
 After 31 years and seven months of its broadcast programming run, Maalaala Mo Kaya aired its final episode with a total of 30 seasons, making the longest-running drama anthology on Philippine television.
 December 11 - Dr. Love Radio Show, the country's longest-running radio program that offering advice on love and spiritual matters to the public, which premiered on 1997 and its also broadcast on television via TeleRadyo since 2007, aired its final episode after 24 years on air.
 December 12 - Rock Entertainment Holdings replaced Rock Extreme with Rock Action.
 December 15 - KBS Korea, an overseas pay channel service owned by Korean Broadcasting System was launched in the Philippines through Cignal and Sky Cable.

Cancelled
 April 30 - GMA Network originally slated to organize their presidential debates, "Debate 2022: The GMA Presidential Face-off" but silently cancelled due to unknown reasons.
 August 10 - Lopez Holdings Corporation (ABS-CBN Corporation) and PLDT's Beneficial Trust Fund (MediaQuest Holdings) originally signed a joint venture convertible note partnership wherein a press release announcement on August 11 for the reach landmark deal with a controlling shares in percentage stake of ABS-CBN's investment agreement by 34.99% acquisition to TV5 Network, Inc. as well as Cignal TV's sale and purchase agreement by 38.88% investment to Sky Cable Corporation. On August 24, both media entities temporary suspended the closing preparations of its investment deal to give their address for the companies' collaboration agreement space following the raising concerned issues from the Congress of the Philippines, National Telecommunications Commission and other government regulatory agencies. On September 1, ABS-CBN Corporation, Cignal Cable Corporation, López, Inc., Sky Vision Corporation and TV5 Network, Inc. have mutually agreed the termination of their investment deal through formalization for its memorandum of agreement in disclosures to the Philippine Stock Exchange and the Securities and Exchange Commission citing the parties confirmed of no implementation on any of the transactions.
 December 23 - Cignal and SatLite has suppose to terminate Rock Extreme on its line-up due to the review of the management's decision through restructuring content and rebranding of the said network to Rock Action since December 12. However, Cignal TV has discontinued the termination of the said channel on its satellite TV services.

Debuts

Major networks

A2Z

The following are programs that debuted on A2Z:

 January 1: TV Patrol Weekend
 January 3: Afternoon Zinema (A2Z Zinema) and TV Patrol
 January 15: I Can See Your Voice (season 4)
 January 24: The Broken Marriage Vow
 February 8: Word for the Season
 February 9: Prayerline
 February 11: Worship, Word and Wonders
 February 17: AgriKids (School at Home)
 March 19: My Papa Pi (season 1)
 April 10: KBYN: Kaagapay ng Bayan
 April 23: Parent Experiment (YeY Famtime)
 April 24: He's Into Her (season 2)
 May 16: 2 Good 2 Be True (2G2BT)
 May 30: Love in 40 Days
 June 25: Flower of Evil and Idol Philippines (season 2)
 June 27: A Family Affair
 July 16: Tropang LOL
 August 8: News Patrol
 August 15: Mars Ravelo's Darna: The TV Series (2022)
 August 21: Bola Bola
 September 11: Run To Me
 September 24: Everybody, Sing! (season 2)
 September 25: Mang Lalakbay (Kidz Weekend)
 October 9: Lyric and Beat
 October 10: Hero City Kids Force
 October 15: Hoy, Love You Two
 October 31: Ever Night: War of Brilliant Splendours
 November 5: Hoy, Love You 3
 November 14: The Iron Heart
 November 19: Dream Maker
 December 4: Click, Like, Share (season 3)

Re-runs
 February 5: Care Bears: Unlock the Magic (Kidz Weekend) and PJ Masks (Kidz Weekend)
 February 7: Touch Your Heart
 February 21: Be My Lady
 March 28: Init sa Magdamag
 April 2: Oddbods (seasons 1 and 2; Kidz Weekend)
 April 17: Lego Ninjago (seasons 1 and 2; Kidz Weekend)
 April 18: Meow: The Secret Boy
 May 30: Code Name: Terrius
 July 2: Pororo the Little Penguin (season 5; Kidz Weekend)
 July 16: Mr. Bean: The Animated Series (season 3; Kidz Weekend) and Naruto Shippuden (season 10; Kidz Weekend) 
 July 18: Be Careful with My Heart
 August 7: Charlotte (Kidz Weekend)
 August 22: Pop Babies (School Anywhere)
 August 29: Bagani
 November 7: Flower of Evil
 November 28: Ang sa Iyo Ay Akin

Notes
^  Originally aired on ABS-CBN
^  Originally aired on GMA
^  Originally aired on Yey!
^  Originally aired on Jeepney TV
^  Originally aired on Hero (now defunct)
^  Originally aired on Q (now GTV)
^  Originally aired on Knowledge Channel
^  Originally aired on NBN (now PTV)
^  Originally aired on Kapamilya Channel

GMA

The following are programs that debuted on GMA Network:

 January 3: Mano Po Legacy: The Family Fortune and My Husband-in-Law
 January 7: Eat Well, Live Well, Stay Well (season 3)
 January 10: I Can See You: AlterNate and Little Princess
 January 24: Bad Genius: The Series and Prima Donnas (season 2)
 January 29: Agimat ng Agila (season 2)
 February 7: The Penthouse (season 3)
 February 14: Balitang Southern Tagalog (GMA Batangas), Dapat Alam Mo!, Douluo Continent and First Lady
 February 20: The Best Ka!
 February 28: Backstreet Rookie and Widows' Web
 March 7: Artikulo 247
 March 14: Mano Po Legacy: Her Big Boss
 March 21: Family Feud (4th incarnation)
 March 27: Beyond Today
 April 4: One the Woman
 April 18: The Herbal Master
 April 24: Raya Sirena
 April 25: Raising Mamay
 April 30: Ultraman Taiga
 May 2: Apoy sa Langit and False Positive
 May 9: Man of Vengeance
 May 14: Jose & Maria's Bonggang Villa
 May 30: Bolera and The Witch's Diner
 June 6: The Fake Life, Love You Stranger and The Skywatcher
 June 11: Pepito Manaloto: Tuloy ang Kuwento
 June 20: The Maid and Show Window: The Queen's House
 July 4: Lolong (season 1) and Prophecy of Love
 July 11: Miss the Dragon and My Forever Sunshine
 July 24: Ultraman Z
 July 25: TiktoClock
 August 1: Return to Paradise
 August 15: About Time and The Red Sleeve
 August 28: The Wall Philippines (season 2)
 August 29: One Night Steal, To Me, It's Simply You and What We Could Be
 September 3: Running Man Philippines
 September 4: Meteo Heroes
 September 5: Abot-Kamay na Pangarap and One North Central Luzon (GMA Dagupan and GMA Ilocos)
 September 26: Nakarehas na Puso and Start-Up PH
 October 3: Maria Clara at Ibarra
 October 10: Ghost Doctor and The Wolf
 October 14: Eat Well, Live Well, Stay Well (season 4)
 October 30: Home Base Plus (season 23)
 October 31: Mano Po Legacy: The Flower Sisters, The New Legends of Monkey and Put Your Head on My Shoulder
 November 7: My Shy Boss and Unica Hija
 November 28: Ancient Love Poetry
 December 5: Another Miss Oh

Re-runs
 January 10: Dragon Ball Z
 January 24: Queen and I
 February 14: Princess Hours
 March 21: I Hear Your Voice
 April 25: Gokusen (season 1)
 June 13: The Worst Witch (season 3)
 July 23: Martin Mystery
 July 25: Daimos (2017 dub reboot)
 September 3: Oggy and the Cockroaches
 September 19: Goblin
 September 26: Gokusen (season 2)
 October 22: Ultraman R/B
 November 28: Flame of Recca
 December 19: What's Wrong with Secretary Kim
 December 26: Agimat ng Agila (season 1)

Notes
^  Originally aired on ABS-CBN
^  Originally aired on TV5
^  Originally aired on Asianovela Channel (now defunct)

TV5

The following are programs that debuted on TV5:

 January 12: Cine Cinco Hollywood Edition
 January 24: The Broken Marriage Vow and Remember: War of the Son
 March 13: The Chiefs
 March 19: Masked Singer Pilipinas (season 2)
 March 21: La suerte de Loli
 March 27: FPJ: Da King
 April 18: Lakwatsika
 May 16: 2 Good 2 Be True (2G2BT)
 May 23: Dear God (season 1)
 May 28: Rolling In It Philippines (season 2)
 May 30: Love in 40 Days
 June 18: Mga Kwentong Epik and Top Class
 June 19: Kusina ni Mamang
 June 25: Idol Philippines (season 2)
 June 27: A Family Affair
 July 10: Shootaround
 July 16: It's Showtime and Sing Galing Kids
 July 18: BalitaOnenan! and Suntok sa Buwan
 August 6: Oh My Korona
 August 15: Mars Ravelo's Darna: The TV Series (2022)
 August 22: Sin vergüenza
 September 24: Everybody, Sing! (season 2)
 September 27: Moonbug Cartoons
 September 27: Cocomelon, Go Buster and Little Baby Bum 
 October 1: Kalye Kweens
 October 15: Cine Classico
 October 31: Ever Night: War of Brilliant Splendours
 November 14: The Iron Heart
 December 3: Tik Talks
 December 14: Oras ng Himala
 December 17: The Brilliant Life
 December 31: Regal Movies

Re-runs
 January 10: Marimar
 January 16: Happy Naman D'yan!
 January 16/July 18: Lokomoko, Lokomoko U, Tropa Mo Ko Unli and Wow Mali Pa Rin!
 February 5: Krypton
 February 7: Touch Your Heart
 February 26: DC's Legends of Tomorrow (season 2)
 March 12: Samurai Jack
 April 18: Camp Lazlo, Foster's Home for Imaginary Friends, Meow: The Secret Boy, Throwback Favorites Presents and Uncle Grandpa
 April 18: Enchanted Garden (Throwback Favorites Presents)
 May 8: Designated Survivor
 May 30: María la del Barrio
 July 16: Puto (2021 television remake)
 July 18: Dragons: Race to the Edge, My Hero Academia (seasons 1 and 2) and Trolls: The Beat Goes On!
 October 17: Ang Panday (2016)
 November 7: Flower of Evil
 December 17: Top 20 Funniest
 December 26: Encounter (Philippine adaptation)

Notes
^  Originally aired on One Screen (now defunct)
^  Originally aired on ABS-CBN
^  Originally aired on A2Z
^  Originally aired on Kapamilya Channel
^  Originally aired on CNN Philippines
^  Originally aired on Yey!

State-owned networks

PTV

The following are programs that debuted on People's Television Network:

 January 22: Entrepinas TV
 February 12: One DA sa TV
 March 4: i-ARTA Na 'Yan!
 March 17: The Chatroom
 April 4: Know Your Candidates
 April 10: Paliwanag: The 2022 Election Townhall Series
 June 19: Pet Pals TV (season 2)
 August 20: PTV Sports Weekend
 September 5: Mike Abe Live
 September 18: Legal Dapat
 September 24: KooPinoy: ACDI MPC'S Cooperative TV

IBC

The following are programs that debuted on IBC:

 February 27: Bet to Serve
 July 11: Padayon: The NCCA Hour
 September 3: Ulat Bayan Weekend
 September 12: PTV Sports, Rise and Shine Pilipinas and Sentro Balita
 September 25: Agri TV Atbp.: Kasama sa Hanapbuhay and Shakey's Super League
 October 8: Dokyubata TV
 October 31: IBC Express Balita (News Bulletin)

Minor networks
The following are programs that debuted on minor networks:

 January 9: Quizon CT (Comedy Theater) on Net 25
 January 24: Ano Sa Palagay N'yo?: Primetime on Net 25
 February 28: EZ Shop on Net 25
 March 7: Kristiano Drama on UNTV
 March 21: Mi Esperanza, Never Twice, Palabra de Amor and Panalo o Talo, It's You! on Net 25
 March 26: Bida Kayo Kay Aga on Net 25
 April 4: Mata ng Agila International on Net 25
 April 9: Oh No, Its B.O.! (Biro Only) on Net 25
 May 10: Balitaan at Kumustahan sa IZ, Balitang Todo Lakas, Dear Ate Juday, IZ Balita Nationwide sa Umaga, IZ Balita sa Hapon, In the Heart of Business, Karambola, O.R.O. (Obserbasyon, Reaksiyon at Opinyon) sa DWIZ, Musika at Balitaan, Pangga Ruth Abao Live, Radyo Klinika, Ratsada sa Umaga, Señor Balita, Serbisyong Lubos sa Otso Otso Dos, StorIZ of Love, Sulong na, Bayan, Tambayan sa DWIZ, Trending Ngayon and Yes, Yes Yo, Topacio! on IZTV
 May 11: Pilipinas Ngayon Na and Serbisyong Bayan ni Tatay Rannie on IZTV
 May 14: Balitang Paliparan, Beyond Wellness with Ms. P, Biyahe ni David Oro, Bgy. 882, El Pueblo Publico, Echoes of the Heart, Isyu ng Bayan, IZ Balita Nationwide Sabado, Mag-Usap Tayo, Mr. Taxman, Labanan Para sa Karapatan, Obet P sa IZ, Pulis @ Ur Serbis, Sa Kabukiran at Kabuhayan and Sapol ni Jarius Bondoc on IZTV
 May 15: Ano’ng Say ni Father, Ano’ng Say nina Brothers?, Bella Filipina, IZ Balita Nationwide Linggo, Gawin ang Tama, Manila Cathedral Mass, Pasiklaban sa DWIZ, Senior Citizens’ Forum, Showbiz sa IZ, Todong Nationwide Talakayan and Usapang Payaman!on IZTV
 May 16: SCWC Konek on IZTV
 June 5: Miffy's Adventures Big and Small on Net 25
 June 11: Lutong Daza on Net 25
 June 12: Transformers: Rescue Bots on Net 25
 June 27: A Place in the Sun on Net 25
 July 3: Sine Throwback on Net 25
 July 18: Fatal Promise on Net 25
 August 8: Shopping All the Way with Jojo A. on Net 25
 August 31: Counterpoint on Net 25
 September 4: Love, Bosleng & Tali! on Net 25
 September 13: InstaJam, K-Lite 103.5 FM, News Night, River Where the Moon Rises, Toni Talks and Wowowin on All TV
 September 17: All Flix on All TV
 October 1: Ano'ng Meron kay Abok? on Net 25
 October 2: Korina Interviews on Net 25
 October 3: Toni on All TV
 October 3: Two Sisters on Net 25
 October 16: Tara Game, Agad Agad! Level Up on Net 25
 October 24: Again My Life on All TV
 November 21: Kingdom Force on SMNI
 November 26: EZ Shop, Island Living and Kuha All! on All TV
 November 28: M.O.M.s: Mhies on a Mission and From Now On, Showtime! on All TV
 December 4: The Financial District on IZTV
 December 12: Daydreamer on Net 25

Re-runs
 September 14: Doble Kara and Ngayon at Kailanman on All TV
 September 26: Sana Dalawa ang Puso on All TV

Notes
^  Originally aired on ABS-CBN

Other channels
The following are programs that debuted on other channels: 

 January 3: The Dark Widow and The Two Lives of Estela Carrillo on Telenovela Channel
 January 8: Discover Eats, From Helen's Kitchen and MomBiz on One PH
 January 10: I Can See You: AlterNate on GTV
 January 14: Celebrity Obsessed on TAP TV
 January 15: I Can See Your Voice (season 4) on Kapamilya Channel
 January 15: At Your Home on One PH
 January 16: West of Liberty on TAP Edge
 January 23: The Key of David on GTV
 January 24: The Broken Marriage Vow on Jeepney TV and Kapamilya Channel
 February 2: The Equalizer (2021, season 1) on TAP Edge
 February 3: Noughts + Crosses on TAP Edge
 February 5: Young Rock on TAP TV
 February 6: Proyekto Pilipino on Jeepney TV
 February 6: Sunday Kapamilya Blockbusters on Kapamilya Channel
 February 7: Mano Po Legacy: The Family Fortune on GTV
 February 14: First Lady on GTV
 February 21: Girl Next Room on GTV
 February 21: Good Girls on TAP Edge
 February 28: Widows' Web on GTV
 March 7: Doctor John on GTV
 March 7: Corazón Salvaje and Road to Destiny on Telenovela Channel
 March 14: Princess Weiyoung on Heart of Asia
 March 19: My Papa Pi (season 1) on Kapamilya Channel
 March 21: BalitaOnenan! on BuKo Channel
 March 21: Julius and Tintin: Para sa Pamilyang Pilipino on One PH
 March 27: Ride Tribe on CNN Philippines
 April 2: Dobol Weng sa Dobol B (Dobol B TV) on GTV
 April 10: KBYN: Kaagapay ng Bayan on Kapamilya Channel and TeleRadyo
 April 17: AgriKids on Kapamilya Channel
 April 18: Suits on TAP Edge
 April 18: My Sweet Curse on Telenovela Channel
 April 19: New Amsterdam (2018, season 1) on TAP Edge
 April 22: The Girl in the Woods and Ordinary Joe on TAP Edge
 April 23: Parent Experiment (YeY FamTime) on Jeepney TV and Kapamilya Channel
 April 24: He's Into Her (season 2) on Kapamilya Channel
 May 2: False Positive on GTV
 May 2: A Beloved Man on Telenovela Channel
 May 7: One Balita Weekend on One PH
 May 10: Me Always You on GTV
 May 16: 2 Good 2 Be True (2G2BT) on Jeepney TV and Kapamilya Channel
 May 17: Fargo on TAP Edge
 May 21: Art of the Spirit on Heart of Asia
 May 23: Almusal All G, Barangayan, Bida Body Part, Ekstra Ordinaryo, Gscovery, Life Guro, Moments, Oohlat, Palong Follow, Playlist, Playlist Natin, Pera o Bayong (PoB), Sumpungan, Swerteng Sulpot Jr., Team Slapsoil and UZI on PIE Channel
 May 28: Dr. Cares on PIE Channel
 May 29: Lokal, Oohlascope, Oohlat Weather and Swerteng Sulpot on PIE Channel
 May 30: Bolera on GTV
 May 30: Love in 40 Days on Jeepney TV and Kapamilya Channel
 June 19: The Box on TAP Edge
 June 25: TOLS on GTV
 June 25: Flower of Evil on Jeepney TV
 June 25: Flower of Evil and Idol Philippines (season 2) on Kapamilya Channel
 June 27: Behind Your Smile on GTV
 June 27: A Family Affair on Jeepney TV and Kapamilya Channel
 July 2: Lakas ng Siyensya on TeleRadyo
 July 4: Lolong (season 1) on GTV
 July 11: Late Night Delight, My Sweet Lie (ETCerye) and Pinoy Mega Hits on Solar Flix
 July 11: Action After Dark on Solar Sports
 July 12: Sine Siesta on Solar Flix
 July 16: Travel with Kach on Jeepney TV
 July 16: Tropang LOL on Kapamilya Channel
 July 16: Buhay Barangay on Radyo Bandido TV
 July 16: Reeltime and Weekend Sine Nights on Solar Flix
 July 17: Silver Screen on CNN Philippines
 August 1: Balansyado on DZRH TV
 August 8: K-Pop Rewind on Hallypop
 August 8: EZ Shop on Solar Flix
 August 15: Mars Ravelo's Darna: The TV Series (2022) on Cine Mo! and Kapamilya Channel
 August 20: From the Heart Specials: Like a Fairytale on Heart of Asia
 August 21: Bola Bola on Kapamilya Channel
 August 29: Nabi, My Stepdarling and What We Could Be on GTV
 September 1: Viva Movie Classics on GTV
 September 4: The Bold Type (season 3) on Tap TV
 September 5: Wild Lands on Telenovela Channel
 September 11: Delayed Justice on GTV
 September 11: Run To Me on Kapamilya Channel
 September 11: The Little Drummer Girl on TAP Edge
 September 12: Dagdag Bawas, Eto Na Nga!, Matching Matching and Sumpungan HQ on PIE Channel
 September 12: Love to Death on Telenovela Channel
 September 17: The Chosen One on PIE Channel
 September 18: ONE Warrior Series: Philippines on GTV
 September 18: Pak! Palong Follow, Pasok mga Suki!, PIE Night Long Sessions and Sino'ng Manok Mo? on PIE Channel
 September 19: Balitanghali on Heart of Asia and I Heart Movies
 September 19: Moon Daughters on Telenovela Channel
 September 24: Fear Times on GTV
 September 24: Everybody, Sing! (season 2) on Kapamilya Channel
 September 25: Mang Lalakbay on Kapamilya Channel
 September 25: Shakey's Super League on Solar Sports
 September 26: Start-Up PH on GTV
 October 1: Woman in Action on One News
 October 2: Hallypop Fresh on Hallypop
 October 2: Woman in Action on One PH
 October 2: Kalye Kweens on Sari-Sari Channel
 October 3: Maria Clara at Ibarra on GTV
 October 3: Radyo Bandido Balita on Radyo Bandido TV
 October 4: Hallypop Hits on Hallypop
 October 6: Hallypop Lokal on Hallypop
 October 9: Lyric and Beat on Kapamilya Channel
 October 10: Hero City Kids Force on Kapamilya Channel
 October 10: Touching You (ETCerye) on Solar Flix
 October 10: Italian Bride on Telenovela Channel
 October 13: Monkey and Dog Romance (ETCerye) on Solar Flix
 October 15: CNN Philippines 10 on CNN Philippines 
 October 15: Hoy, Love You Two on Kapamilya Channel
 October 16: Pusong Pinoy sa Amerika (season 17) on GTV
 October 16: All-Out Sundays on Heart of Asia and I Heart Movies
 October 18: Bubble Up (ETCerye) on Solar Flix
 October 23: Philippine Realty TV (season 20) on CNN Philippines
 October 29: The Formula on Heart of Asia
 October 31: Ever Night: War of Brilliant Splendours on Jeepney TV and Kapamilya Channel
 November 5: Hoy, Love You 3 on Kapamilya Channel
 November 6:  V-League on CNN Philippines
 November 6: One For All, All For One! on INC TV
 November 7: The Merciless Judge on GTV
 November 7: Gokusen (season 3) on Heart of Asia
 November 13: The Word Exposed on Solar Flix
 November 14: Beauty Boy on GTV
 November 14: The Iron Heart on Jeepney TV and Kapamilya Channel
 November 19: Dream Maker on Kapamilya Channel
 November 19: NegoSHEnte on TeleRadyo
 November 26: Boy For Rent on GTV
 November 27: All-Out Sundays on GTV
 December 3: Tik Talks on One PH
 December 4: Rainbow Prince on Heart of Asia
 December 4: Click, Like, Share (season 3) on Kapamilya Channel
 December 4: Tik Talks on One News
 December 26: Hogu's Love and Mano Po Legacy: The Flower Sisters on GTV

Re-runs
 January 2: The Bureau of Magical Things and Mako Mermaids on GTV
 January 3: Rhodora X on Heart of Asia
 January 3: Dahil sa Pag-ibig on Jeepney TV
 January 3: Something in the Rain on Kapamilya Channel
 January 9: Super Laff-In on Cine Mo!
 January 9: Angry Birds Stella on GTV
 January 9: Annaliza on Jeepney TV
 January 9: Usapang Real Life on One PH
 January 10: Moon Embracing the Sun on GTV
 January 10: The Penthouse (season 1) on Heart of Asia
 January 17: The Love Knot and Pure Intention on Heart of Asia
 January 17: The Adventures of Sonic the Hedgehog on Jeepney TV
 January 29: Dok Ricky, Pedia on Kapamilya Channel
 January 31: The Borrowed Wife on Heart of Asia
 January 31: Mirabella on Jeepney TV
 January 31: Hyde, Jekyll, Me on Kapamilya Channel
 February 5: The Adventures of Sonic the Hedgehog on Kapamilya Channel
 February 5: Brooklyn Nine-Nine on TAP TV
 February 6: Komiks Presents: Wakasan on Jeepney TV
 February 7: Okay Ka, Fairy Ko! on BuKo Channel
 February 7: The Desire on Heart of Asia
 February 7: Ina, Kapatid, Anak and Touch Your Heart on Jeepney TV
 February 7: Touch Your Heart on Kapamilya Channel
 February 14: Two Spirits' Love on Heart of Asia
 February 14: Kahit Isang Saglit on Jeepney TV
 February 21: Prince of Wolf on Heart of Asia
 February 21: Be My Lady on Kapamilya Channel
 February 26: Robocar Poli on Jeepney TV
 February 27: Hunter × Hunter (season 2; 2011) on GTV
 February 28: Lovers in Paris and Maging Sino Ka Man on Jeepney TV
 March 7: Scarlet Heart on Heart of Asia
 March 7: Kokey on Jeepney TV
 March 14: Lie After Lie on Heart of Asia
 March 14: Hiram na Mukha on Jeepney TV
 March 14: Mama Fairy and the Woodcutter on Kapamilya Channel
 March 16: Ghost Fighter on GTV
 March 19: The Last Empress on Heart of Asia
 March 21: Huwag Ka Lang Mawawala on Jeepney TV
 March 26: Honesto and Midnight Phantom on Jeepney TV
 March 27: Budoy on Jeepney TV
 March 28: Init sa Magdamag on Kapamilya Channel
 April 2: La Doña on Heart of Asia
 April 2: Ang Munting Paraiso on Jeepney TV
 April 4: God of Lost Fantasy and My Love from Another Star on Heart of Asia
 April 4: The Wedding on Jeepney TV
 April 11: Oh My Baby on Heart of Asia
 April 11: Sana Maulit Muli on Jeepney TV
 April 11: Hwayugi: A Korean Odyssey on Kapamilya Channel
 April 17: When Duty Calls on Heart of Asia
 April 18: Dwarfina on Heart of Asia
 April 18: Johnny Test (season 4) and Meow: The Secret Boy on Jeepney TV
 April 18: Meow: The Secret Boy on Kapamilya Channel
 April 25: Emperor: Ruler of the Mask on Heart of Asia
 April 25: Palimos ng Pag-ibig and Sana Bukas pa ang Kahapon on Jeepney TV
 May 2: Endless Love (season 2; ETCerye Rewind) on ETC (now Solar Flix)
 May 2: The Legend of the Blue Sea on GTV
 May 2: The Penthouse (season 2) on Heart of Asia
 May 2: Encounter on Kapamilya Channel
 May 7: Signal on GTV
 May 16: The General's Daughter, Gulong ng Palad, Lastikman, Nagsimula sa Puso and The Story of Us on Jeepney TV
 May 21: Wicked Angel on Heart of Asia
 May 21: Doble Kara on Jeepney TV
 May 22: Love Beyond Time on Heart of Asia
 May 22: Annaliza and Mula sa Puso (2011) on Jeepney TV
 May 23: Pyra: Babaeng Apoy and When the Weather Is Fine on Heart of Asia
 May 28: Misty on Heart of Asia
 May 29: Wolfblood (season 1) on GTV
 May 30: Game of Affection on Heart of Asia
 May 30: Code Name: Terrius on Kapamilya Channel
 June 4: A Beautiful Affair on Jeepney TV
 June 5: Ready, Set, Read! and Wow! on Kapamilya Channel
 June 6: Innocent Defendant and Woman of Dignity on Heart of Asia
 June 6: Dyosa and Sa Piling Mo on Jeepney TV
 June 13: In Time With You on Heart of Asia
 June 13: Natutulog Ba ang Diyos? and Walang Hanggan on Jeepney TV
 June 20: While You Were Sleeping on Heart of Asia
 June 20: Hanggang Saan on Jeepney TV
 June 26: Fire of Eternal Love on Heart of Asia
 June 27: Code Name: Yong Pal on GTV
 June 27: Marco on Jeepney TV
 July 3: Prinsesa ng Banyera on Jeepney TV
 July 4: Playful Kiss on Heart of Asia
 July 4: Flower Crew: Dating Agency on Kapamilya Channel
 July 9: Fates & Furies on Heart of Asia
 July 11: Charlotte on Jeepney TV
 July 12: Etcetera on Solar Flix
 July 13: In Her Shoes on Solar Flix
 July 16: Scripting Your Destiny on Heart of Asia
 July 16: Masha and the Bear and Pororo The Little Penguin on Kapamilya Channel
 July 18: Extraordinary You on Heart of Asia
 July 18: Langit Lupa and Mutya on Jeepney TV
 July 18: Be Careful with My Heart on Kapamilya Channel
 July 24: Project Destination on GTV
 July 25: Mr. Queen on Heart of Asia
 July 31: Dinofroz on GTV
 August 1: Mr. Merman and The Sand Princess on Heart of Asia
 August 6: Pinoy Samurai on BuKo Channel
 August 6: Love Actually on Heart of Asia
 August 7: Aladdin: You Would've Heard the Name on Heart of Asia
 August 8: Lokomoko U and Wow Meganon on BuKo Channel
 August 8: Munting Heredera on Heart of Asia
 August 13: Everybody Hapi and Mongolian Barbecue on BuKo Channel
 August 15: Love in the Moonlight on GTV
 August 15: Finding Love and My Absolute Boyfriend on Heart of Asia
 August 20: Pure Intention on Heart of Asia
 August 22: Peter Pan and Wendy on Jeepney TV
 August 22: On the Wings of Love on PIE Channel
 August 27: The Peep Show on Solar Flix
 August 28: Pop Babies on Kapamilya Channel
 August 29: The Half Sisters and My Love from the Star on Heart of Asia
 August 29: Florinda, Kahit Puso'y Masugatan and Katorse on Jeepney TV
 August 29: Bagani and Melting Me Softly on Kapamilya Channel
 September 3: The Worst Witch (season 3) on GTV
 September 4: Wolfblood (season 2) on GTV
 September 5: Boys Over Flowers on Heart of Asia
 September 5: Lorenzo's Time and Sana Dalawa ang Puso on Jeepney TV
 September 12: Tinderella on BuKo Channel
 September 12: The Gifted on Heart of Asia
 September 12: Judy Abbott on Jeepney TV
 September 19: The Penthouse (season 3) on Heart of Asia
 September 19: The Blood Sisters and Pieta on Jeepney TV
 September 26: Kristine and The Promise of Forever on Jeepney TV
 October 2: Puppy in My Pocket: Adventures in Pocketville on GTV
 October 3: Yes, Yes Show! on Cine Mo!
 October 8: Sky Castle and While You Were Sleeping on Heart of Asia
 October 9: Inday Wanda on on BuKo Channel
 October 10: Backstreet Rookie, The Frog Prince and The Gifted: Graduation on Heart of Asia
 October 10: Apoy sa Dagat on Jeepney TV
 October 15: Juan dela Cruz on Jeepney TV
 October 17: Little Women II on Jeepney TV
 October 17: Meow: The Secret Boy on Kapamilya Channel
 October 23: Love Thy Woman on Jeepney TV
 October 24: Angel's Last Mission on Heart of Asia
 October 24: My Little Juan on Jeepney TV
 October 31: Moon Embracing the Sun on Heart of Asia
 November 5: The Love Knot on Heart of Asia
 November 7: The Better Half, Flower of Evil and The Trapp Family Singers on Jeepney TV
 November 7: Flower of Evil on Kapamilya Channel
 November 12: You're My Home on Jeepney TV
 November 13: Mga Kwentong Epik on Sari-Sari Channel
 November 14: The Heirs on Heart of Asia
 November 14: Ningning on Jeepney TV
 November 19: Where Stars Land on Heart of Asia
 November 19: Bagong Umaga on Jeepney TV
 November 21: Tale of the Nine Tailed on Heart of Asia
 November 28: Christmas Cartoon Festival Presents on GTV
 November 28: Doctor John on Heart of Asia
 November 28: Ang sa Iyo Ay Akin and Love in Sadness on Kapamilya Channel
 December 3: Heirs of the Night on GTV
 December 3: Secret Garden on Heart of Asia
 December 12: Douluo Continent on Heart of Asia
 December 12: Ikaw ay Pag-Ibig and Remi, Nobody's Girl on Jeepney TV
 December 17: The Good Son on Jeepney TV
 December 19: Bad Genius: The Series on Heart of Asia
 December 19: Got to Believe and Saan Ka Man Naroroon on Jeepney TV
 December 25: God of Lost Fantasy and Oh My Baby on Heart of Asia
 December 26: Scarlet Heart on Heart of Asia
 December 26: Magkaribal on Jeepney TV
 December 31: Love Alert on Heart of Asia

Notes
^  Originally aired on ABS-CBN
^  Originally aired on GMA
^  Originally aired on TV5
^  Originally aired on Cine Mo!
^  Originally aired on Yey!
^  Originally aired on S+A (now defunct)
^  Originally aired on GMA News TV (now GTV)
^  Originally aired on Jeepney TV
^  Originally aired on Sari-Sari Channel
^  Originally aired on Hero (now defunct)
^  Originally aired on ETC (now Solar Flix)
^  Originally aired on Jack TV (now defunct)
^  Originally aired on 2nd Avenue (now defunct)
^  Originally aired on CT (now defunct)
^  Originally aired on Studio 23 (now defunct)
^  Originally aired on Q (now GTV)
^  Originally aired on RPN (now CNN Philippines)
^  Originally aired on Fox Filipino (now defunct)
^  Originally aired on Kapamilya Channel
^  Originally aired on Metro Channel
^  Originally aired on Asianovela Channel (now defunct)
^  Originally aired on NBN (now PTV)
^  Originally aired on Knowledge Channel
^  Originally aired on CNN Philippines
^  Originally aired on A2Z
^  Originally aired on GTV
^  Originally aired on IBC
^  Originally aired on ABC (now TV5)

Video streaming services
The following are programs that debuted on video streaming services: 

 January 12: Click, Like, Share (season 3) on iWantTFC
 January 14: Dear God (season 1) on iWantTFC and KTX
 January 23: Lulu on VivaMax
 February 14: The Goodbye Girl on iWantTFC
 February 27: L on VivaMax
 March 20: The Seniors on VivaMax
 March 26: Bola Bola on iWantTFC
 April 3: Gandara the BEKsplorer on VivaMax
 April 4: How to Move On in 30 Days on YouTube (ABS-CBN Entertainment)
 April 10: Iskandalo on VivaMax
 April 22: He's Into Her (season 2) on iWantTFC
 April 25: Misis Piggy on iWantTFC
 May 21: Run To Me on iWantTFC
 May 22: Gameboys (season 2) on KTX and VivaMax Plus
 June 5: High on Sex on VivaMax
 June 11: Ang Babae Sa Likod ng Face Mask on YouTube (Puregold Channel)
 July 16: Beach Bros on iWantTFC
 July 30: Kumusta Bro?: The Series on VivaMax Plus
 July 30: Coke Studio Philippines (season 6) on YouTube (Coke Studio Philippines)
 July 31: Wag Mong Agawin ang Akin on VivaMax
 August 10: Lyric and Beat on iWantTFC
 August 15: Sleep With Me on iWantTFC
 August 17: Drag Race Philippines (season 1) on Discovery+, HBO Go and WOW Presents Plus
 August 19: Drag Race Philippines: Untucked! (season 1) on Discovery+, HBO Go and WOW Presents Plus
 September 16: Love Bites on YouTube (ABS-CBN Entertainment)
 September 25: An/Na on VivaMax
 September 30: Hoy, Love You 3 on iWantTFC
 October 7: Tara, G! on iWantTFC
 October 14: K-Love on Viu
 October 23: Secrets of a Nympho on VivaMax
 November 4: Kambyoteros on YouTube (Cine Mo!)
 November 17: One Good Day on Amazon Prime Video
 December 8: Drag Den on Amazon Prime Video
 December 18: Lovely Ladies Dorm on VivaMax

Returning or renamed programs

Major networks

State-owned networks

Minor networks

Other channels

Video streaming services

Programs transferring networks

Major networks

State-owned networks

Minor networks

Other channels

Video streaming services

Milestone episodes
The following shows that made their milestone episodes in 2022:

Finales

Major networks

A2Z

The following are programs that ended on A2Z:

 January 2: Come and Hug Me
 January 21: Marry Me, Marry You
 January 29: Aksyon Time (seasons 1 and 2), Peppa Pig (seasons 1 and 2; Kidz Weekend) and Rob the Robot (Kidz Weekend)
 February 4: La Vida Lena (full series)
 February 18: Nang Ngumiti ang Langit
 March 2: Prayerline
 March 4: Word for the Season and Worship, Word and Wonders
 March 25: Love Thy Woman
 March 26: PJ Masks (Kidz Weekend; rerun)
 April 3: Zine Love (A2Z Zinema)
 April 10: F4 Thailand: Boys Over Flowers and Inazuma Eleven GO: Chrono Stone (Kidz Weekend)
 April 13: Touch Your Heart
 May 13: Viral Scandal
 May 27: Meow: The Secret Boy (rerun)
 May 29: Pinoy Big Brother: Kumunity Season 10
 June 18: My Papa Pi (season 1)
 June 19: I Can See Your Voice (season 4)
 June 24: The Broken Marriage Vow
 June 25: Care Bears: Unlock the Magic (Kidz Weekend) and Oddbods (seasons 1 and 2; Kidz Weekend)
 July 15: Code Name: Terrius
 July 31: Lego Ninjago (seasons 1 and 2; Kidz Weekend)
 August 12: FPJ's Ang Probinsyano
 August 14: He's Into Her (season 2)
 August 26: Init sa Magdamag (rerun)
 September 4: Bola Bola
 September 18: Idol Philippines (season 2)
 October 2: Run To Me
 October 9: Flower of Evil
 October 28: Love in 40 Days
 October 30: Hoy, Love You Two
 November 4: A Family Affair
 November 11: 2 Good 2 Be True (2G2BT)
 November 13: Hoy, Love You 3
 November 25: Bagani
 November 27: Lyric and Beat
 December 10: Maalaala Mo Kaya
 December 11: Click, Like, Share (season 3) and Mang Lalakbay (Kidz Weekend)
 December 18: Charlotte (Kidz Weekend; rerun)
 December 30: Be My Lady

Stopped airing

GMA

The following are programs that ended on GMA Network:

 January 7: Stories from the Heart and The World Between Us (season 2)
 January 8: Ghost Fighter (rerun)
 January 14: Las Hermanas
 January 15: Karelasyon (rerun)
 January 20: My Love from the Star (rerun)
 January 21: The Gifted: Graduation
 February 4: I Can See You: AlterNate
 February 11: I Left My Heart in Sorsogon, The Worst Witch (season 3) and Wowowin
 February 13: Dear Uge
 February 25: Bad Genius: The Series and Mano Po Legacy: The Family Fortune
 March 4: Ang Lihim ni Annasandra (rerun)
 March 11: The Penthouse (season 3)
 March 17: Queen and I (rerun)
 March 18: Dapat Alam Mo!
 March 20: Home Base Plus (season 22)
 March 27: Toriko (season 2; rerun)
 March 31: My Husband-in-Law
 April 1: Eat Well, Live Well, Stay Well (season 3)
 April 13: Backstreet Rookie
 April 22: Douluo Continent and Little Princess
 April 24: Ultraman R/B
 April 29: Widows' Web
 April 30: Prima Donnas (season 2)
 May 6: Princess Hours
 May 7: Agimat ng Agila (season 2)
 May 27: False Positive and One the Woman
 June 2: I Hear Your Voice (rerun) and Mano Po Legacy: Her Big Boss
 June 3: Artikulo 247
 June 4: Pepito Manaloto: Ang Unang Kuwento
 June 5: The Best Ka! and Raya Sirena
 June 10: Gokusen (season 1; rerun)
 June 17: The Herbal Master and The Witch's Diner
 July 1: First Lady, The Maid and Mars Pa More
 July 8: Man of Vengeance and The Worst Witch (season 3; rerun)
 July 17: Dinofroz
 July 23: Ultraman Taiga
 July 29: Raising Mamay
 August 11: Love You Stranger
 August 12: Show Window: The Queen's House
 August 25: The Skywatcher
 August 26: Bolera and Prophecy of Love
 August 27: Jose & Maria's Bonggang Villa
 August 28: Puppy in My Pocket: Adventures in Pocketville (rerun)
 September 2: Balitang Amianan (GMA Dagupan and GMA Ilocos)
 September 3: Apoy sa Langit
 September 16: My Forever Sunshine
 September 17: Daimos (2017 dub reboot; rerun)
 September 23: About Time, The Fake Life and Miss the Dragon
 September 30: Lolong (season 1)
 October 6: One Night Steal
 October 7: The Red Sleeve
 October 16: Ultraman Z
 October 23: Angry Birds Toons (rerun)
 October 27: What We Could Be
 October 28: Goblin and Gokusen (season 2; rerun)
 October 30: Happy ToGetHer (seasons 1 and 2)
 November 4: Return to Paradise and To Me, It's Simply You
 November 20: Yo-kai Watch Shadowside
 November 25: The New Legends of Monkey
 December 2: Ghost Doctor
 December 4: The Wall Philippines (season 2)
 December 16: Put Your Head on My Shoulder
 December 18: Running Man Philippines (season 1)
 December 23: Start-Up PH
 December 29: The Wolf
 December 30: My Shy Boss

Stopped airing

TV5

The following are programs that ended on TV5:

 January 8: María la del Barrio
 January 21: Marry Me, Marry You and True Beauty
 January 29: Kagat ng Dilim (season 1; 2020; rerun)
 February 4: La Vida Lena (full series)
 February 19: #ParangNormal Activity (rerun)
 March 5: Sing Galing: Sing-lebrity Edition (season 1)
 March 6: M Countdown and My Hero Academia (seasons 1 and 2)
 March 18: Reply 1988 (rerun)
 April 13: Adventure Time (rerun), Dexter's Laboratory (rerun), Ed, Edd n Eddy (rerun), Generator Rex (rerun), The Marvelous Misadventures of Flapjack (rerun) and Touch Your Heart
 May 12: Remember: War of the Son
 May 13: Viral Scandal
 May 19: Niña Niño
 May 27: Meow: The Secret Boy
 May 28: Krypton and Marimar (rerun)
 May 29: Designated Survivor
 June 11: DC's Legends of Tomorrow (season 2; rerun)
 June 18: Masked Singer Pilipinas (season 2)
 June 19: The Chiefs
 June 24: The Broken Marriage Vow
 July 9: Sari-Sari Presents: Viva Cinema
 July 12: Enchanted Garden (Throwback Favorites Presents; rerun)
 July 14: Dear God (season 1)
 July 15: 44 Cats, Lakwatsika, Regal Academy and Winx Club (rerun)
 August 12: FPJ's Ang Probinsyano
 August 19: Reina de corazones
 August 20: Top Class
 September 16: Cine Cinco Hollywood Edition
 September 18: Idol Philippines (season 2)
 September 23: My Hero Academia (seasons 1 and 2; rerun)
 September 24: Rolling In It Philippines (season 2)
 October 8: Puto (2021 television remake; rerun)
 October 11: BalitaOnenan!, Lokomoko (Happy Naman D'yan!; rerun), Lokomoko U (Happy Naman D'yan!; rerun), Tropa Mo Ko Unli (Happy Naman D'yan!; rerun) and Wow Mali Pa Rin! (Happy Naman D'yan!; rerun)
 October 13: María la del Barrio (rerun)
 October 15: Mga Kwentong Epik
 October 16: Samurai Jack (rerun) and Sine Todo
 October 28: Love in 40 Days
 November 4: A Family Affair
 November 11: 2 Good 2 Be True (2G2BT)
 November 26: Oh My Korona
 December 3: Sing Galing Kids
 December 8: Suntok sa Buwan
 December 22: Sing Galing! (2nd incarnation; season 2)
 December 24: Kalye Kweens

Stopped airing

State-owned networks

PTV

The following are programs that ended on People's Television Network:

 February 25: Sundown (season 2)
 March 27: One DA sa TV
 May 6: Know Your Candidates
 May 7: Paliwanag: The 2022 Election Townhall Series
 June 24: Cabinet Report and Network Briefing News
 June 29: Tutok PDEA: Kontra Droga
 July 1: Digong 8888 Hotline
 July 9: Magandang Gabi Pilipinas
 July 10: Unlad Pilipinas
 July 11: PNA Newsroom
 September 4: Tulay: Your Bridge to Understanding, Peace and Prosperity
 September 11: Pet Pals TV (season 2)

IBC

The following are programs that ended on IBC:

 February 27: Minning Town
 April 28: Bet to Serve
 June 4: DepEd TV
 June 10: PNA Newsroom
 June 24: Network Briefing News

Minor networks
The following are programs that ended on minor networks:

 January 20: Balitalakayan on Net 25
 March 17: Ano Sa Palagay N'yo?: Primetime on Net 25
 March 19: Agila Probinsiya on Net 25
 April 1: Eagle News International and Funniest Snackable Videos on Net 25
 April 30: Eagle News UK and Europe on Net 25
 April 30: Istorya on UNTV
 May 15: Tara Game, Agad Agad! on Net 25
 May 22: EBC Sports International on Net 25
 June 4: Cucina ni Nadia on Net 25
 June 24: Panalo o Talo, It's You! on Net 25
 June 29: DepEd TV on BEAM TV
 July 15: Never Twice on Net 25
 August 5: Let's Get Ready To TV Radyo on Net 25
 August 12: EZ Shop on Net 25
 September 16: K-Lite 103.5 FM on All TV
 September 24: Bida Kayo Kay Aga on Net 25
 September 30: Toni Talks on All TV
 September 30: Palabra de Amor on Net 25
 October 22: Biyaheng Langit and Kasangga Mo ang Langit on RJ DigiTV
 October 23: River Where the Moon Rises on All TV
 November 2: Tambayan sa DWIZ on IZTV
 November 27: Again My Life on All TV
 November 27: Pasiklaban sa DWIZ on IZTV
 November 27: Healing Galing Live! on UNTV
 December 9: Mi Esperanza on Net 25

Other channels
The following are programs that ended on other channels:

 January 1: The Shannara Chronicles (season 2) on GTV
 January 1: Raket Science on One PH
 January 2: Angry Birds Blues and Piggy Tales: Third Act on GTV
 January 2: The Best Talk with Boy Abunda (season 2) on Jeepney TV
 January 2: Come and Hug Me on Kapamilya Channel
 January 7: Finding Love and The World Between Us (season 2) on GTV
 January 7: Fates & Furies, I Left My Heart in Sorsogon (remaining episodes continued via GMA and GTV) and The World Between Us (season 2) on Heart of Asia
 January 10: Stories of Hope on GTV
 January 11: On Record on GTV
 January 12: Tunay na Buhay on GTV
 January 14: Nakee (rerun) and The Romantic Doctor 2 on Heart of Asia
 January 14: Max Steel on Jeepney TV
 January 16: Merry Flixmas on Hallypop
 January 21: Marry Me, Marry You on Jeepney TV
 January 21: I am Not a Robot (rerun) and Marry Me, Marry You on Kapamilya Channel
 January 28: Kakambal ni Eliana on Heart of Asia
 January 28: Oh My G! (rerun) on Jeepney TV
 January 29: Max Steel and Uncoupling on Kapamilya Channel
 January 30: Pokémon the Series: Sun and Moon on GTV
 January 30: Home Along Da Riles (rerun) and Ipaglaban Mo! on Jeepney TV
 February 4: Iskul Bukol and Pidol's Wonderland on BuKo Channel
 February 4: I Can See You: AlterNate on GTV
 February 4: The Blooming Treasure on Heart of Asia
 February 4: La Vida Lena (full series) and Starla (rerun) on Jeepney TV
 February 4: La Vida Lena (full series) on Kapamilya Channel
 February 4: It Had to Be You on Telenovela Channel
 February 11: I Left My Heart in Sorsogon on GTV
 February 11: Rising Sun (season 2) on Heart of Asia
 February 11: Nasaan Ka Nang Kailangan Kita (rerun) on Jeepney TV
 February 14: Riviera on TAP Edge
 February 18: The Frog Prince on GTV
 February 18: The Love Knot on Heart of Asia
 February 18: Nang Ngumiti ang Langit on Kapamilya Channel
 February 19: Kongsuni and Friends on Jeepney TV
 February 25: Mano Po Legacy: The Family Fortune on GTV
 February 25: Dahil sa Pag-Ibig and Vietnam Rose on Jeepney TV
 March 4: Moon Embracing the Sun on GTV
 March 4: The Penthouse (season 1) on Heart of Asia
 March 4: Aryana (rerun) on Jeepney TV
 March 4: Papá a toda madre on Telenovela Channel
 March 6: TableLove with Pinky on ETC
 March 11: Pure Intention and Rhodora X on Heart of Asia
 March 11: Tayong Dalawa (rerun) on Jeepney TV
 March 11: Something in the Rain on Kapamilya Channel
 March 13: Born for You on Jeepney TV
 March 15: Fairy Tail (season 3) on GTV
 March 18: Kadenang Ginto on Jeepney TV
 March 19: Hello from the Other Side on GTV
 March 19: Doble Kara (rerun) and The Legal Wife (rerun) on Jeepney TV
 March 20: Annaliza (rerun) on Jeepney TV
 March 25: Girl Next Room on GTV
 March 25: Love Thy Woman (rerun) on Kapamilya Channel
 March 26: Buena Manong Balita (Saturday edition; Dobol B TV) on GTV
 March 26: Price of Passion on Heart of Asia
 March 30: After the Fact on ABS-CBN News Channel
 April 1: Prince of Wolf and Two Spirits' Love on Heart of Asia
 April 2: We Rise Together on Kapamilya Channel
 April 3: Sunday Kapamilya Blockbusters on Kapamilya Channel
 April 8: The Desire on Heart of Asia
 April 8: Kokey (rerun) and Lovers in Paris on Jeepney TV
 April 8: Hyde, Jekyll, Me on Kapamilya Channel
 April 10: AgriCOOLture and F4 Thailand: Boys Over Flowers on Kapamilya Channel
 April 13: Hiram na Alaala on Heart of Asia
 April 13: Touch Your Heart on Jeepney TV and Kapamilya Channel
 April 15: The Adventures of Sonic the Hedgehog on Jeepney TV
 April 15: The Two Lives of Estela Carrillo on Telenovela Channel
 April 22: Endless Love (season 2; ETCerye) on ETC
 April 22: Lie After Lie on Heart of Asia
 April 22: Hiram na Mukha and Huwag Ka Lang Mawawala (rerun) on Jeepney TV
 April 29: Widows' Web on GTV
 April 29: Scarlet Heart on Heart of Asia
 April 29: Mama Fairy and the Woodcutter on Kapamilya Channel
 April 29: The Dark Widow on Telenovela Channel
 May 6: Doctor John on GTV
 May 13: Kahit Isang Saglit, Mirabella (rerun), Sana Maulit Muli (rerun), Viral Scandal and The Wedding on Jeepney TV
 May 13: Viral Scandal on Kapamilya Channel
 May 14: Midnight Phantom (rerun) on Jeepney TV
 May 15: The Last Empress (rerun) on Heart of Asia
 May 15: Komiks Presents: Wakasan (rerun) on Jeepney TV
 May 20: The Borrowed Wife and Oh My Baby on Heart of Asia
 May 22: The Bureau of Magical Things on GTV
 May 22: When Duty Calls on Heart of Asia
 May 27: False Positive on GTV
 May 27: Princess Weiyoung on Heart of Asia
 May 27: Meow: The Secret Boy on Jeepney TV and Kapamilya Channel (rerun)
 May 29: Pinoy Big Brother: Kumunity Season 10 on Jeepney TV
 May 29: AgriKids, Pahina and Pinoy Big Brother: Kumunity Season 10 on Kapamilya Channel
 May 29: TeleRadyo Balita Weekend on TeleRadyo
 June 3: Emperor: Ruler of the Mask (rerun) and The Penthouse (season 2) on Heart of Asia
 June 3: Maging Sino Ka Man (rerun) on Jeepney TV
 June 10: My Love from Another Star on Heart of Asia
 June 10: Ina, Kapatid, Anak (rerun) and Palimos ng Pag-ibig on Jeepney TV
 June 17: God of Lost Fantasy on Heart of Asia
 June 17: Sana Bukas pa ang Kahapon (rerun) on Jeepney TV
 June 17: Hwayugi: A Korean Odyssey on Kapamilya Channel
 June 18: Legend of Paranormal Story (rerun) on GTV
 June 18: My Papa Pi (season 1) on Kapamilya Channel
 June 19: Legend of Fuyao (rerun) on Heart of Asia
 June 19: I Can See Your Voice (season 4) on Kapamilya Channel
 June 24: The Legend of the Blue Sea and Me Always You on GTV
 June 24: The Broken Marriage Vow and Johnny Test (season 4; rerun) on Jeepney TV
 June 24: The Broken Marriage Vow on Kapamilya Channel
 June 26: Taste Buddies on GTV
 July 1: First Lady on GTV
 July 1: When the Weather Is Fine on Heart of Asia
 July 1: Encounter on Kapamilya Channel
 July 3: Misty (rerun) on Heart of Asia
 July 8: ETCinema on ETC
 July 8: The Garfield Show on Jeepney TV
 July 9: Art of the Spirit on Heart of Asia
 July 9: The Adventures of Sonic the Hedgehog on Kapamilya Channel
 July 10: The Dean Mel Show on One PH
 July 15: Game of Affection on Heart of Asia
 July 15: Gulong ng Palad (rerun) and Lastikman (rerun) on Jeepney TV
 July 15: Code Name: Terrius (rerun) and Kapamilya Blockbusters on Kapamilya Channel
 July 16: Tech Ka Muna on One PH
 July 17: Wolfblood (season 1) on GTV
 July 22: Innocent Defendant on Heart of Asia
 July 29: Metro Manila Ngayon on DZRH TV
 July 29: While You Were Sleeping (rerun) and Woman of Dignity (rerun) on Heart of Asia
 July 31: Super Laff-In and Trabahanap TV on Cine Mo!
 August 5: Dwarfina on Heart of Asia
 August 12: FPJ's Ang Probinsyano on Cine Mo! and Kapamilya Channel
 August 12: Code Name: Yong Pal on GTV
 August 12: In Time With You and Playful Kiss on Heart of Asia
 August 13: Scripting Your Destiny on Heart of Asia
 August 14: He's Into Her (season 2) on Kapamilya Channel
 August 19: Charlotte on Jeepney TV
 August 20: In Her Shoes on Solar Flix
 August 26: Behind Your Smile and Bolera on GTV
 August 26: Pyra: Babaeng Apoy and The Sand Princess on Heart of Asia
 August 26: Nagsimula sa Puso (rerun), Natutulog Ba ang Diyos? and The Story of Us (rerun) on Jeepney TV
 August 26: Flower Crew: Dating Agency and Init sa Magdamag (rerun) on Kapamilya Channel
 August 27: Mako Mermaids on GTV
 August 28: Project Destination on GTV
 August 31: Slam Dunk on GTV
 September 2: News.PH (2nd incarnation) on CNN Philippines
 September 2: Extraordinary You (rerun) on Heart of Asia
 September 2: Hanggang Saan (rerun) and Mutya (rerun) on Jeepney TV
 September 2: Road to Destiny on Telenovela Channel
 September 3: K-Drama Special Stories on GTV
 September 4: Hunter × Hunter (season 2; 2011; rerun) and Sine Date Weekends on GTV
 September 4: Bola Bola on Kapamilya Channel
 September 4: WWE NXT UK on TAP Sports
 September 9: Mr. Merman on Heart of Asia
 September 9: Marco on Jeepney TV
 September 9: Corazón Salvaje on Telenovela Channel
 September 10: Signal on GTV
 September 16: Mr. Queen on Heart of Asia
 September 16: The General's Daughter (rerun) and Sa Piling Mo (rerun) on Jeepney TV
 September 16: A Beloved Man on Telenovela Channel
 September 17: TOLS on GTV
 September 17: From the Heart Specials: Like a Fairytale and Wicked Angel (rerun) on Heart of Asia
 September 18: Idol Philippines (season 2) on Kapamilya Channel
 September 23: Florinda and Langit Lupa (rerun) on Jeepney TV
 September 25: Yo-Kai Watch (seasons 1 to 3) on GTV
 September 25: Rolling In It Philippines (season 2) on Sari-Sari Channel
 September 30: Banana Split on Cine Mo!
 September 30: Lolong (season 1) on GTV
 October 2: Pure Intention (rerun) on Heart of Asia
 October 2: Run To Me on Kapamilya Channel
 October 7: Finding Love, The Gifted and My Absolute Boyfriend (rerun) on Heart of Asia
 October 7: My Sweet Curse on Telenovela Channel
 October 8: Ikaw Lamang (rerun) on Jeepney TV
 October 9: Flower of Evil on Jeepney TV and Kapamilya Channel
 October 12: Touching You (ETCerye) on Solar Flix
 October 14: Peter Pan and Wendy on Jeepney TV
 October 14: Melting Me Softly (rerun) on Kapamilya Channel
 October 17: Monkey and Dog Romance (ETCerye) on Solar Flix
 October 21: My Love from the Star on Heart of Asia
 October 21: Lorenzo's Time (rerun) on Jeepney TV
 October 21: Bubble Up (ETCerye) and Endless Love (season 2; ETCerye Rewind) on Solar Flix
 October 23: La Doña on Heart of Asia
 October 28: What We Could Be on GTV
 October 28: The Penthouse (season 3) on Heart of Asia
 October 28: Love in 40 Days on Jeepney TV and Kapamilya Channel
 October 30: The Formula on Heart of Asia
 October 30: Hoy, Love You Two on Kapamilya Channel
 November 3: Love in the Moonlight on GTV
 November 4: The Gifted: Graduation on Heart of Asia
 November 4: A Family Affair, Judy Abbott and Walang Hanggan (rerun) on Jeepney TV
 November 4: A Family Affair on Kapamilya Channel
 November 5: Doble Kara (rerun) on Jeepney TV
 November 10: Nabi, My Stepdarling on GTV
 November 11: Boys Over Flowers (rerun) on Heart of Asia
 November 11: 2 Good 2 Be True (2G2BT) and Dyosa (rerun) on Jeepney TV
 November 11: 2 Good 2 Be True (2G2BT) on Kapamilya Channel
 November 12: Honesto (rerun) on Jeepney TV
 November 13: Sky Castle (rerun) on Heart of Asia
 November 13: Hoy, Love You 3 on Kapamilya Channel
 November 18: Backstreet Rookie on Heart of Asia
 November 25: Angel's Last Mission (rerun) on Heart of Asia
 November 25: Bagani and Meow, The Secret Boy (rerun) on Kapamilya Channel
 November 26: Oh My Job! (Dobol B TV) on GTV
 November 26: While You Were Sleeping (rerun) on Heart of Asia
 November 27: Detective Conan (season 8) and ONE Warrior Series: Philippines on GTV
 November 27: Lyric and Beat on Kapamilya Channel
 December 9: Gokusen (season 3) on Heart of Asia
 December 9: Little Women II and My Little Juan on Jeepney TV
 December 9: Wild Lands on Telenovela Channel
 December 10: A Beautiful Affair on Jeepney TV
 December 10: Maalaala Mo Kaya on Kapamilya Channel
 December 11: Click, Like, Share (season 3) and Mang Lalakbay on Kapamilya Channel
 December 11: Dr. Love on TeleRadyo
 December 16: The Frog Prince (rerun) on Heart of Asia
 December 16: The Blood Sisters (rerun), Pieta (rerun) and The Promise of Forever (rerun) on Jeepney TV
 December 17: The Chosen One (season 1) on PIE Channel
 December 18: Fire of Eternal Love (rerun) and The Love Knot (rerun) on Heart of Asia
 December 23: Moon Embracing the Sun on Heart of Asia
 December 23: Beauty Boy and Start-Up PH on GTV
 December 23: Sana Dalawa ang Puso (rerun) on Jeepney TV
 December 24: Love Actually (rerun) and Where Stars Land (rerun) on Heart of Asia
 December 24: Lakas ng Siyensya on TeleRadyo
 December 25: Angry Birds Stella (rerun) on GTV
 December 25: Aladdin: You Would've Heard the Name (rerun) on Heart of Asia
 December 25: Mula sa Puso (2011; rerun) on Jeepney TV
 December 25: Kalye Kweens on Sari-Sari Channel
 December 30: Ghost Fighter on GTV
 December 30: Tale of the Nine Tailed on Heart of Asia
 December 30: Apoy sa Dagat (rerun) and My Little Juan on Jeepney TV
 December 30: Be My Lady on Kapamilya Channel
 December 30: Tuloy Po Kayo on One News and One PH

Stopped airing

Video streaming services

 January 21: Quaranthings (season 2) on Upstream PH
 January 22: Saying Goodbye on iQiyi
 January 22: Happy Place on iWantTFC
 January 28: The Kangks Show on WeTV iflix
 February 2: Hello, Heart on iQiyi
 February 2: Click, Like, Share (season 3) on iWantTFC
 February 19: The Goodbye Girl on iWantTFC
 February 24: Love at the End of the World on GagaOOLala
 March 11: Dear God (season 1) on iWantTFC and KTX
 March 13: L and Lulu on VivaMax
 April 10: Bola Bola on iWantTFC
 April 30: Misis Piggy on iWantTFC
 May 8: The Seniors on VivaMax
 June 5: Gandara the BEKsplorer on VivaMax
 June 12: Gameboys (season 2) on KTX and VivaMax Plus
 June 12: Iskandalo on VivaMax
 June 24: How to Move On in 30 Days on YouTube (ABS-CBN Entertainment)
 June 25: Run To Me on iWantTFC
 July 24: High on Sex on VivaMax
 July 31: Beach Bros on iWantTFC
 August 3: He's Into Her (season 2) on iWantTFC
 August 27: Ang Babae Sa Likod ng Face Mask on YouTube (Puregold Channel)
 September 17: Coke Studio Philippines (season 6) on YouTube (Coke Studio Philippines)
 September 18: Wag Mong Agawin ang Akin on VivaMax
 September 23: Lyric and Beat on iWantTFC
 October 1: Kumusta Bro?: The Series on VivaMax Plus
 October 7: Drag Race Philippines: Untucked! (season 1) on Discovery+, HBO Go and WOW Presents Plus
 October 12: Drag Race Philippines (season 1) on Discovery+, HBO Go and WOW Presents Plus
 October 16: An/Na on Vivamax
 October 21: Hoy, Love You 3 on iWantTFC
 December 11: Secrets of a Nympho on VivaMax
 December 22: One Good Day on Amazon Prime Video

Networks
The following are a list of free-to-air and cable channels or networks launches and closures in 2022.

Launches

Rebranded
The following is a list of television stations or cable channels that have made or will make noteworthy network rebrands in 2022.

Closures

Stopped broadcasting
The following is a list of stations and channels or networks that have stopped broadcasting or (temporarily) off the air in 2022.

Notes

 : via Cignal and SatLite until December 23 as Rock Extreme
 : via Sky Cable since December 6
 : via Sky Cable since December 5
 : via Sky Cable since November 18
 : via Cablelink since circa September 19–25
 : via DTT from June 1 to October 31
 : via Cablelink until June 22 as ETC; since July 18 as Solar Flix
 : via G Sat until June 20 as ETC

Services
The following are a list of television operators or providers and streaming media platforms or services launches and closures in 2022.

Launches

Rebranded
The following is a list of streaming providers that have made or will make noteworthy service rebrands in 2022.

Stopped streaming
The following is a list of providers and platforms or services that have stopped operating or streaming in 2022.

Deaths
January
 January 14 – Maoi Roca, (b. 1974), basketball player and actor.
 January 21 – Salvador Royales, (b. 1947), veteran writer and radio drama director of DZRH.
 January 23 – Romano Vasquez, (b. 1970), actor and former cast member of That's Entertainment.

February
 February 2 – Rustica Carpio, (b. 1930), veteran actress and playwright.
 February 15 – Dong Puno, (b. 1946), veteran broadcaster and former Press Secretary.
 February 21 – Eduardo Roy Jr., (b. 1980), director, producer and screenwriter.

March
 March 5 – Luz Fernandez, (b. 1935), veteran actress.
 March 17 – Bobby Nalzaro, (b. 1963), veteran regional broadcaster and columnist.

April
 April 7 – Carlos Salazar, (b. 1931), veteran actor and singer.
 April 16
 Boyet Sison, (b. 1963), sportscaster and segment anchor of Alam N'yo Ba? on TV Patrol.
 Gloria Sevilla, (b. 1932), film actress.
 April 23 – Florencio "Zaldy" Perez, (b. 1957), broadcaster and sportswriter.

May
 May 10 – Fanny Serrano, (b. 1948), celebrity makeup artist and stylist.
 May 15 – Miguel Faustmann, (b. 1954), theater actor.
 May 20 – Susan Roces, (b. 1941), veteran actress.

June
 June 9 – Mark Shandii Bacolod, (b. 1984), director, producer and talent manager.

July
 July 11 – Phillip Lazaro, (b. 1970), actor, comedian and director.
 July 22 – Carlos "Caloy" Alde, (b. 1961), actor and comedian.
 July 23 – Boy Alano, (b. 1941), actor.

August
 August 3 – Gladys Lana-Lucas, (b. 1960), radio host.
 August 5 – Cherie Gil, (b. 1963), actress.
 August 9 – Raissa Puno-Diaz, (b. 1977), broadcast journalist.
 August 10 – Reign André Loleng, (b. 1982), writer.
 August 13 – Melvyn "Panginoon" Calderon, (b. 1952), photojournalist and host of 'Wag Po!.
 August 17 – Danilo "Totong" Federez, (b. 1960), puppeteer and voice of Arn-arn on Unang Hirit.
 August 22 – Romy Suzara, (b. 1938), veteran director.
 August 24 – Ma. Clarissa "Ilsa" Reyes, (b. 1970), Catholic media personality.

September
 September 13 – Vic Dimagiba, (b. 1949), former Undersecretary of Department of Trade and Industry and co-host of Konsyumer Atbp.
 September 16 – John Susi, (b. 1965), broadcaster.

October
 October 31 – Danny Javier, (b. 1947), singer-songwriter and member of APO Hiking Society.

November
 November 19 – Flora Gasser, (b. 1932), veteran actress.

December
 December 1 – Sylvia La Torre, (b. 1933), singer and actress.
 December 9 – Jovit Baldivino, (b. 1993), singer and first grand champion winner of Pilipinas Got Talent (season 1).

See also
 2022 in television

References

 
Television in the Philippines by year
Philippine television-related lists